Lance Duijvestijn (born 15 January 1999) is a Dutch professional footballer who plays as a midfielder for Eerste Divisie club Almere City.

Club career
Born in Wateringen, Duijvestijn began his youth career at SV VELO before moving to the ADO Den Haag academy. After failing to break into to first team, he moved to NEC, where he made his Eerste Divisie debut for on 17 August 2018 in a match against Cambuur, as a 77th-minute substitute for Sven Braken.

In 2019, he returned to his former club ADO Den Haag where he played for the reserve team, Jong ADO, in the fourth-tier Derde Divisie. There, he established himself as a prolific scorer for midfield, among others scoring four goals in a 4–2 win over Gemert. After Alan Pardew took over as new head coach of the ADO first team, Duijvestijn saw his chances of breaking into the first team diminish. After a trial with Quick Boys in May 2020, he eventually moved to Helmond Sport on 30 July 2020 on a one-year deal with the option of one more year.

On 29 June 2021, Duijvestijn signed a three-year contract with Almere City. He made his debut on 9 August in a 1–2 loss to Jong AZ, playing the entire game. Less than two weeks later, in his third game for the club, Duijvestijn scored his first goal in the third minute, but saw his team lose 1–2 to VVV-Venlo.

References

External links
 
 Career stats & Profile - Voetbal International

1999 births
Living people
People from Wateringen
Association football midfielders
Dutch footballers
Netherlands youth international footballers
NEC Nijmegen players
ADO Den Haag players
Helmond Sport players
Almere City FC players
Eerste Divisie players
Derde Divisie players
Footballers from South Holland